Mahomet and His Successors is a book written by American author Washington Irving, and published in 1850 and a follow-up to his previous book Life of Mahomet.

Summary
This is a history of the life of Muhammad, and a number of persons who followed him.

Composition and publication history
Irving began writing notes for a book on Muhammed as early as 1827 while working on his biography of Christopher Columbus. He completed his first chapters of the book while simultaneously working on his Tales of the Alhambra. He offered Life of Mahomet to Murray in England for 500 guineas. In a letter to his John Murray, dated October 8, 1827, Irving noted: "In our conversation you will recollect it was agreed that I should received 500 Gs. For the Legendary life of Mahomet... I will thank you to have the work put to press as soon as possible". It was not published.

After returning to the United States from several years abroad, settled at his New York home Sunnyside, he rapidly completed The Life of Mahomet and Mahomet and His Successors, which were published in 1849 and 1850, respectively.

References

External links
 Mahomet and His Successors at Internet Archive

1850 non-fiction books
Biographies of Muhammad
Works by Washington Irving